Faecalicatena orotica is a bacterium in the family of Lachnospiraceae.

References

Bacteria described in 1954
Lachnospiraceae